Glenn Sears (born August 18, 1958, in Apex, North Carolina) is a retired professional race car driver who competed in limited NASCAR Busch Series races in the 1980s. Sears was a champion at Wake County Speedway and Southern National Champion in North Carolina as well as winning several NASCAR Sportsman series races.

References
 
 
 Glenn Sears at Ultimate Racing History

1958 births
Living people
NASCAR drivers
People from Apex, North Carolina
Racing drivers from North Carolina